Yen Man-sung (born 27 November 1957) is a Taiwanese archer. He competed in the men's individual and team events at the 1988 Summer Olympics.

References

1957 births
Living people
Taiwanese male archers
Olympic archers of Taiwan
Archers at the 1988 Summer Olympics
Place of birth missing (living people)
20th-century Taiwanese people